The yellow-throated emo skink (Emoia flavigularis) is a species of lizard in the family Scincidae. It is found in Bougainville and the Solomon Islands.

References

Emoia
Reptiles described in 1932
Taxa named by Karl Patterson Schmidt